Lubno  (German Liebenow) is a village in the administrative district of Gmina Lubiszyn (German Ludwigsruh), within Gorzów County, Lubusz Voivodeship, in western Poland.

The village has a population of 740.

References

Lubno